"The Next Episode" is a single by American rapper-producer Dr. Dre, released on June 26, 2000 as the third single from his second studio album, 2001 (1999). The track features Snoop Dogg, Kurupt and Nate Dogg, but only Snoop Dogg is credited. It is a sequel to Dre and Snoop's famous single "Nuthin' but a 'G' Thang" from the former's debut album, The Chronic.

The song peaked at number 23 on the Billboard Hot 100.

The song has been performed live numerous times by both Dr. Dre and Snoop Dogg. Notable performances include the 2000 Up in Smoke Tour and as the opener to Super Bowl LVI halftime show on February 13, 2022.

Background
The single is produced by Dr. Dre and fellow Aftermath producer Mel-Man. Dre's verse was written by then Aftermath artists Hittman, The D.O.C. and Ms. Roq. The single's title harks back to Dre's and Snoop Dogg's smash hit "Nuthin' But a "G" Thang" from Dre's 1992 solo debut The Chronic, in which Snoop Dogg instructs listeners at the end of the chorus to "just chill till the next episode". That line refers to the song "It's My Thing" from the EPMD album Strictly Business, which in fact did not refer to this single but to its predecessor, a song from 1993 originally recorded for Doggystyle but not included in its final version. Snoop, Dre, and Nate each have verses, while Kurupt shares the hook with Snoop and Dre. The song has many references to 2Pac's "California Love", which he did with Dre while at Death Row Records, and To Live & Die in LA. Originally listed on the back cover of Doggystyle as "Tha Next Episode", the original version of the song was by Snoop Dogg featuring Dr. Dre, and had a much different beat and different lyrics. The original was 4:36 long, and referred to Dre's "Nuthin' but a 'G' Thang" numerous times. The background of the original was later used in Warren G's "Runnin' Wit No Breaks" on the Regulate...G Funk Era album.

The song's predominant sample interpolates "The Edge" by David McCallum and producer David Axelrod, originally released on McCallum's 1967 album Music: A Bit More Of Me.

Music video
The music video is set in a strip club with many strippers pole-dancing. It also features many rappers, including Hittman, Ice Cube, Warren G, and Xzibit.

Remixes
A remix with the same name by Snoop Dogg and Lil' Mo appears on the mixtape DJ Felli Fel Featuring Snoop Dogg - The Heavy Hitters, released in 2002. A remix with the music from "Paradise City" by Guns N' Roses is available unofficially. A version dubbed by The Game as a diss toward 50 Cent was released in 2005. A remix titled "TNE 2006" was released to radio airplay in 2006. It features Snoop Dogg & Nate Dogg. Joe Budden rapped over the beat during an appearance on DJ Green Lantern Sirius Satellite Radio show with Charles Hamilton. The prizefighter remix was released in 2001, featuring 2Pac, DMX and Nas. RED drummer Joe Rickard is known to perform this song among other popular rap and hip hop songs live in concert in a medley. A version in Arabic appeared in the 2012 film The Dictator performed by Aiwa, Mr Tibbz, and actor Sacha Baron Cohen as the film's title character, Admiral General Aladeen. In November 2014, trap music producer San Holo released a remix of the song that has since garnered over 250 million views on YouTube. A version by Lyric Jones, Rah Digga and Mark Batson appears in the 2018 film Dude.

Track listing
 UK CD single #1
 "The Next Episode" (LP Version) – 2:42
 "Bad Guys Always Die" (featuring Eminem) – 4:38
 "The Next Episode" (Instrumental) – 2:43
 "The Next Episode" (Music Video)

 UK CD single #2
 "The Next Episode" (LP Version) - 2:42
 "Fuck You" - 3:25
 "Bang Bang" (Instrumental) - 3:42
 "Forgot About Dre" (Instrumental) - 3:54
 "Forgot About Dre" (Music Video)

 12" vinyl
 "The Next Episode" (LP Version) – 2:42
 "Bad Guys Always Die" (featuring Eminem) – 4:38
 "Bang Bang" (featuring Hittman) - 3:42

Charts

Weekly charts

Year-end charts

Certifications

Personnel
Recorded at: Sierra Sonics, Encore Studios
Engineer: Richard "Segal" Huredia
Assistant engineer: Tom Gordon, Michelle Lynn Forbes, Dave Tenhouten
Background Vocals - Kurupt
Bass - Preston Crump
Guitar - Sean Cruse
Keyboards - Camara Kambon
Rap [Featuring] - Snoop Dogg, Kurupt
Vocals [Featuring] - Nate Dogg
Director - Paul Hunter
Writers - Ms Roq, Hittman, Snoop Dogg, Nate Dogg, David McCallum
Video cameo appearance - Xzibit, Hittman, Warren G

References

External links

2000 singles
Dr. Dre songs
Snoop Dogg songs
Nate Dogg songs
Ivy Queen songs
Songs about cannabis
Music videos directed by Paul Hunter (director)
Songs written by Dr. Dre
Songs written by Snoop Dogg
Song recordings produced by Dr. Dre
Aftermath Entertainment singles
Interscope Records singles
Internet memes
Songs written by Nate Dogg
1999 songs
Song recordings produced by Mel-Man